State Route 222 (SR 222) is a primary state highway in the U.S. state of Virginia. Known as Weems Road, the state highway runs  from Weems north to SR 200 near Irvington in southern Lancaster County.

Route description

SR 222 begins at a dead end at Carter Creek in the village of Weems. The state highway heads west, then makes a right-angle turn north. SR 222 curves northeast, passing to the west of North Weems and Christ Church. The state highway reaches its northern terminus at SR 200 (Irvington Road) north of Irvington.

Major intersections

References

External links

Virginia Highways Project: VA 222

222
State Route 222